Leigh Creek Airport  is located  east of the town centre in the locality of Leigh Creek, South Australia.

Charter operators

See also
 List of airports in South Australia

References

Airports in South Australia
Far North (South Australia)